The electoral district of Glenorchy was a single-member electoral district of the Tasmanian House of Assembly. It was based in the northern suburbs of Tasmania's capital city, Hobart, and included New Town, Moonah and Glenorchy.

The seat was created ahead of the Assembly's first election held in 1856, and was abolished when the Tasmanian parliament adopted the Hare-Clark electoral model in 1909.

Members for Glenorchy

References
 
 
 Parliament of Tasmania (2006). The Parliament of Tasmania from 1956

Glenorchy